
Gmina Dopiewo is a rural gmina (administrative district) in Poznań County, Greater Poland Voivodeship, in west-central Poland.

Villages
Gmina Dopiewo contains the villages and settlements of Dąbrowa, Dąbrówka, Dopiewiec, Dopiewo, Drwęca, Fiałkowo, Glinki, Gołuski, Joanka, Konarzewo, Lisówki, Palędzie, Podłoziny, Pokrzywnica, Skórzewo, Trzcielin, Więckowice, Zakrzewo, Żarnowiec and Zborowo.

Neighbouring gminas
Gmina Dopiewo is bordered by the gminas of Buk, Komorniki, Stęszew and Tarnowo Podgórne.

References
Polish official population figures 2006

Dopiewo
Poznań County